Copelatus koreanus is a species of diving beetle. It is part of the genus Copelatus in the subfamily Copelatinae of the family Dytiscidae. It was described by Mori in 1932.

References

koreanus
Beetles described in 1932